Somatia is the sole genus of the acalyptrate brachyceran fly family Somatiidae. The genus includes about seven Neotropical species of small (3-5 mm long) black and yellow flies with a stout and rounded thorax having transverse suture. The legs are separated from the main body by an elongated post-coxal bridge. The broad abdomen is downcurved. The antenna are elbowed with the arista bipectinate. Somatiids resemble members of the Syringogastridae due to the enlarged pronotum and a postcoxal bridge but they have a petiolate abdomen. 

Adult Somatia have been found feeding on a dead caterpillar and aggregating on the extra-floral nectaries of Solanaceae, Bignoniaceae and Passifloraceae.

The placement of the group is doubtful, it is placed in the Diopsoidea but an incomplete phylogenetic analysis has suggested a closeness to the Agromyzidae.

Species in the genus include:
 Somatia aestiva
 Somatia australis
 Somatia carrerai
 Somatia lanei
 Somatia papaveroi
 Somatia schildi
 Somatia sophiston

References

External links 
 Tree of Life

Brachycera genera